Laurie Simmons (born October 3, 1949) is an American artist, photographer and filmmaker. Since the mid-1970s, Simmons has staged scenes for her camera with dolls, ventriloquist dummies, objects on legs, and people, to create photographs that reference domestic scenes. She is part of The Pictures Generation, a name given to a group of artists who came to prominence in the 1970s. The Pictures Generation also includes Cindy Sherman, Barbara Kruger, and Louise Lawler.

Early life 
Simmons was born in Far Rockaway, Queens, New York, the daughter of Dorothy "Dot" Simmons, a housewife, and Samuel Ira "Sam" Simmons, a dentist. Her parents were both Jewish and she was raised in a Jewish community.

Simmons received a BFA from Tyler School of Art in 1971.

Career

Photography 
The mood is dramatically different than in the bathroom views."
Black Series: For the Black Series, Simmons constructed spare rooms with dollhouse furniture and replicas of iconic, easily recognizable artworks. Simmons considered the photographs of these interior spaces her strongest work at the time.
Early Color Interiors (1978): In 1978, Simmons began shooting the figures in the dollhouse in color, to create the "Early Color Interiors" series. At that time, color photography was "more commonly associated with the artifice of commercial photography while black-and-white was perceived to be more truthful. By using the techniques and processes identified with advertising, fashion, and film, Simmons linked her work to a realm of suspended belief--the realm of fantasy and fiction that sustained many of her memories and longings."
Cowboys: After much interest in her Early Color Interiors, Simmons began searching for new subject matter and decided to photograph a set of cowboy figures that belonged to Carroll Dunham. The cowboys were on horseback in an unrestrained outdoor environment, shot in a style reminiscent of television Westerns.
Water Ballet (1979-1981): In 1979, Simmons began photographing dolls in a fish tank and eventually floating underwater in a full-sized pool. During this process, she turned her underwater camera to real people swimming. The result was "Water Ballet," a series that developed as Simmons choreographed underwater movements for her friends and photographed their interpretations.
Color Coordinated Interiors (early 1980s): In the early 1980s, she created the series "Color-Coordinated Interiors", which used Japanese dolls called Teenettes, monochrome toys of women who Simmons photographed in front of rear projection images of interior decorated rooms. The dolls matched the color theme of the rooms.
Tourism (1984): The series that followed was "Tourism," in 1984, which also used the "Teenette" dolls, but showed them in groups visiting famous places around the world, including the Eiffel Tower, the Pyramids, the Parthenon, and the Taj Mahal. This series investigated the mediation of these places through photography and media instead of real experience. "She used the same strategy to shoot the "Tourism" series as she used for the "Color-Coordinated Interiors," populating unrealistically pristine postcard views with her dolls via rear projection. The figures are color-cued to the background scene, which was often unintentionally monochromatic due owing to the poor quality of the slide." The slides were collected by Simmons from tourist shops and museum collections.
Talking Objects (1987): In 1987, Simmons visited the Vent Haven Museum in Kentucky and over a period of a few years photographed various dummies and props there, resulting in the "Talking Objects" series.
Walking and Lying Objects (1987-1991): Simmons began using objects on legs in her series "Walking & Lying Objects" from the late 1980s. The first work in this series is a work from 1987 titled "Walking Camera I (Jimmy the Camera)," of Simmons's friend and former roommate, the late artist Jimmy De Sana, wearing an old-fashioned box camera costume. The photographs that follow use miniatures and small doll legs. "As she animates the objects, Simmons plays out various roles," wrote curator Jan Howard in an essay accompanying Simmons' retrospective at the Baltimore Museum of Art. "Her transformed women parade across a simulated stage as if in a fashion show or a musical, wearing the accoutrements with which they are identified."
Clothes Make the Man: This series of male dummy sculptures were made in collaboration with figure maker Alan Semok. The seven dummies were identical, differentiated only by their clothes and subtitles. Simmons stated that the series "...was just about these minute differences in the way we look or the way we act that make us feel like we’re so profoundly different."
Café of the Inner Mind: Simmons later took a more critical look at the dummies, photographing them in environments and using collage to interject their thoughts or visualizations. Much like the ventriloquists she had seen as a child, Simmons gave the dummies a dialogue based on her own projections. According to Simmons, "the dummy is such a metaphor for lying and telling the truth. The way the ventriloquist is able to say whatever he or she wants to say, through this other character. You don’t have to take responsibility for anything that you’re saying because the dummy said it or the dummy did it. It made me think about a lot of things, from news-casting to public speakers to politicians to friends."
Kaleidoscope House (2001): In 2001, Simmons collaborated with architect Peter Wheelwright to design an interactive modernist dollhouse called the "Kaleidoscope House." The house was decorated with miniature artwork and furniture by contemporary artists and designers. In the artistic statement for the project, Laurie Simmons and Peter Wheelwright wrote: "The Kaleidoscope House came out of our shared interests in domesticity and in particular the changing practices of home and family. Our individual work in photography and architecture has focused on these issues, and the promptings of our respective children have often figured in our thinking.  Clearly, there is a need for a new dollhouse in the family playroom. Our hope is that The Kaleidoscope House with its sliding transparencies and changing aspects will give a colorful view into playful new possibilities." The Kaleidoscope House has become somewhat of a cult collector's item, and the house and accessories can still be found on e-commerce websites.
The Instant Decorator (2001): Also in 2001, Simmons began her "Instant Decorator" series, which was based on a 1976 interior decorating book of the same name, that provided templates of household rooms for the client to fill with swatches of fabric and paint samples. The series features works that are collage-like and opulently filled with accessories and characters in dramatic mises en scène.
The Love Doll (2009): In 2009, Simmons began a new series called "The Love Doll," featuring a lifesize doll from Japan. This series documents the ongoing days in the doll's life.
Kigurumi, Dollers, and How We See: After exploring dolls on a life size scale, Simmons discovered a type of Japanese costume play called kigurumi in which participants become doll-like characters by dressing in masks and bodysuits. Simmons presents this transformative social experience and relates it to our relationship with social media.

Film 
In 2006, Simmons made her first film, The Music of Regret. The film is thought to be an extension of her photographs, bringing her objects to life by involving musicians, professional puppeteers, Alvin Ailey dancers, Hollywood cinematographer Ed Lachman, and actress Meryl Streep. This three-act musical creates a narrative between iconic objects found in her photographs.

Simmons starred in a feature-length film by her daughter Lena Dunham, called Tiny Furniture, which was filmed in 2009 and was featured at the South by Southwest film festival in 2010. Simmons' character, Siri, was based loosely on herself. The film won various awards in 2010, including the Jury Prize for Best Narrative Feature, the Independent Spirit Award for Best First Screenplay, the Los Angeles Film Critics Association's New Generation Awards, and the Sarasota Film Festival's Independent Visions Award. It was nominated for Gotham Awards for best Ensemble Performance, and Breakthrough Director.

Fashion 
In 2008, Simmons collaborated with the designer Thakoon Panichgul to create fabrics for his Spring 2009 line. The pattern featured a variation on Simmons' series "Walking & Lying Objects" from the late eighties, which involved various objects that are animated with legs in different positions. The fabric for Thakoon's line was based on legs paired with a rose.

Simmons also collaborated with Peter Jensen on his 2010 spring collection. Jensen photographed models in poses directed by Simmons based on images from fashion magazines in the '60s and '70s. The resulting photographs were then cut into paper dolls, dressed in a miniature version of Jensen's spring collection, and placed inside Simmons’ typical dollhouse tableaus. The book of photographs was released for London Fashion Week 2009.

Feminism 
Much of Simmons' work concerns the role of women in society.  Her 'objects on legs' photos feature consumer items such as dollhouses, cakes, guns and musical instruments with long, slender legs, intending to make a statement on traditional gender roles.
In 1972, Simmons discovered a vintage dollhouse in the attic of a toy store in Liberty, New York.  This was during the second wave of feminism, and dolls were viewed skeptically by many who claimed that the toys supported subtle domestic indoctrination for young girls.  Simmons was drawn to the strange, strongly gendered appeal of dolls and dollhouses and began photographing them.

In a March 2014 interview, Simmons stated, "When I picked up a camera with a group of other women, I'm not going to say it was a radical act, but we were certainly doing it in some sort of defiance of, or reaction to, a male-dominated world of painting."

In popular culture 
Simmons made a guest appearance on Gossip Girl in 2011 to make a portrait of the van der Woodsen family in a style that resembled her Interior Decorator series from 2001.

Brooklyn-based performance collective, Carroll Simmons, takes their name from combining Simmons' last name with her husband, Carroll Dunham's first.

Personal life 
Simmons lives and works in New York City and Cornwall, Connecticut with her husband, painter Carroll Dunham. They have two children, actress and writer Lena Dunham and writer/activist Cyrus Grace Dunham.

Exhibitions 
Selected solo exhibitions
 1979: "Early Color Interiors" – Artists Space (New York, NY)
 1979: P.S.1 Contemporary Art Center.
 1980: Metro Pictures Gallery (New York, NY)
 2015: Jewish Museum (Manhattan), "How We See," March 13-August 16
Selected group exhibitions
 2000: Open Ends: Minimalism and After – Museum of Modern Art (New York, NY)
 2009: ‘The Pictures Generation, 1974 – 1984’ – Metropolitan Museum of Art (New York, NY)
 2010: ‘Off The Wall: Part 1 – 30 Performative Actions’ – Whitney Museum of American Art (New York, NY)
 2011: ‘Pictures by Women: A History of Modern Photography’ – Museum of Modern Art (New York, NY)
Retrospectives
 1990: San Jose Museum of Art (San Jose, CA)
 1997: The Baltimore Museum of Art (Baltimore, MD)
 2012: Gothenburg Museum of Art (Sweden)
 2014: The Neues Museum in Nuremberg (Germany)

Collections
 Corcoran Gallery of Art (Washington DC)
 Hara Museum (Tokyo)
 Jewish Museum (Manhattan)  (New York, NY)
 Metropolitan Museum of Art
 Museum of Contemporary Art (Los Angeles, CA)
 Museum of Modern Art
 National Museum of Women in the Arts (NMWA), 
 Scottsdale Museum of Contemporary Art (Scottsdale, AZ)
 Solomon R Guggenheim Museum of Art
 Walker Art Center (Minneapolis, MN)
 Whitney Museum of American Art

Honors 
 1984: National Endowment for the Arts Grant
 1997: Guggenheim Fellowship
 2005: The American Academy in Rome, Roy Lichtenstein Residency in Visual Arts
 2006: Temple University, Distinguished Alumni Award
 2013: Brooklyn Museum, Women in the Arts

Filmography 
 2006: The Music of Regret – Producer, Writer, Director
 2010: Tiny Furniture – as Siri
 2016: My Art – Director, Writer

Works and publications 
 
 
 
  Catalog of an exhibition held at the San Jose Museum of Art, California, October 21-December 30, 1990.
 
  Published in conjunction with the exhibition held May 28-August 10, 1997 at the Baltimore Museum of Art
  Published on the occasion of the exhibition of the same name, May 4-June 29, 2002
 
 
  Catalog of an exhibition held at Skarstedt Fine Art, New York (September 19 - October 27, 2007) and Sperone Westwater, New York (27 April - 30 June 2006)
  Published in conjunction with the exhibition "The Love Doll: Days 1-30," in New York, at Salon 94, Feb. 15-Mar. 26, 2011 and in London, at Wilkinson Gallery, June 9-July 10, 2011; "The Love Doll (Geisha): Days 31-36," in Aspen, Colorado, at Baldwin Gallery, Mar. 16-Apr. 15, 2012; and "The Love Doll," in Tokyo, at Tomio Koyama Gallery, in 2013

References

Further reading 
 
 Inside the Artist's Studio, Princeton Architectural Press, 2015.
 Metropolitan Museum of Art: http://www.metmuseum.org/TOAH/hd/pcgn/ho_2004.246.htm
 Interview with Laurie Simmons
 Artforum Laurie Simmons Scale Models
 New York Magazine Laurie Simmons Love Doll: Days 1-30

External links

 

1949 births
American contemporary artists
Jewish American artists
Living people
People from Long Island
Temple University alumni
People from Far Rockaway, Queens
20th-century American women photographers
20th-century American photographers
21st-century American Jews
21st-century American women